The men's pole vault event at the 1972 European Athletics Indoor Championships was held on 12 March in Grenoble.

Results

References

Pole vault at the European Athletics Indoor Championships
Pole